Fair House of Joy may refer to:
"Fair House of Joy", a song by Roger Quilter
Fair House of Joy, a 1950 novel by Dennis Parry